Blackton may refer to:

 Blackton (surname), a surname
 Blackton, Arkansas, a location in unincorporated Monroe County, Arkansas, United States
 Blackton Reservoir, a reservoir in County Durham, England, United Kingdom

See also
 Black Township (disambiguation)
 Blacktown (disambiguation)
 Black (disambiguation)
 Black Town in India